This is a partial discography of Giuseppe Verdi's opera, La forza del destino.

1862 original version

1869 revised version

References

Opera discographies
Operas by Giuseppe Verdi